The 2018 Carpathian Trophy was the 50th edition of the Carpathian Trophy held in Bucharest, Romania between 23–24 November as a women's friendly handball tournament organised by the Romanian Handball Federation.

The most recent Olympic champions, Russia, appeared in the competition.

It was televised by TVR1 and TVR HD.

Knockout stage
All times are local (UTC+02:00).

Bracket

Semifinals

Third place game

Final

Awards  
Most Valuable Player: 
Best Defender: 
Best Goalkeeper: 
Top Scorer:

References

External links
Official website

Carpathian Trophy
Carpathian Trophy
Carpathian Trophy
Sport in Bucharest
Carpathian Trophy